Steven Elliot Brenner is a professor at the Department of Plant and Microbial Biology at the University of California Berkeley, adjunct professor at the Department of Bioengineering and Therapeutic Sciences at the University of California, and San Francisco
Faculty scientist, Physical Biosciences at the Lawrence Berkeley National Laboratory.

Education
Brenner gained his Bachelor of Arts in 1992 from Harvard University and Doctor of Philosophy in 1997 from the University of Cambridge for research supervised by Cyrus Chothia. He was one of the creators of the Structural Classification of Proteins (SCOP) database while working at the Laboratory of Molecular Biology (LMB) in Cambridge, UK.

Career and research
 research in Brenner's laboratory investigates:

 Individual genome interpretation
 The regulation of gene expression by alternative splicing and nonsense-mediated decay of messenger RNA
 Protein function prediction using Bayesian phylogenomics

Awards and honors
In 2010 he was awarded the Overton Prize from the International Society for Computational Biology.

References

University of California, Berkeley College of Letters and Science faculty
American bioinformaticians
Living people
21st-century American biologists
Overton Prize winners
Harvard University alumni
Alumni of the University of Cambridge
Fellows of the International Society for Computational Biology
Year of birth missing (living people)
UC Berkeley College of Engineering faculty